Abdullah Toprak is a Turkish Greco-Roman wrestler competing in the 72 kg division. He is a member of Kayseri Şeker Club.

Career 
Abdullah Toprak won the gold medal in the Greco-Roman style 63 kg at the 2019 European Juniors Wrestling Championships in Spain. He won the gold medal by defeating his European champion opponent Georgian Leri Abuladze in the final with a good contest and 8–2.

Abdullah Toprak captured the silver medal in men's Greco-Roman 72 kg at 2022 European U23 Wrestling Championships.

References

External links 
 

Turkish male sport wrestlers
Living people
2000 births
People from Kayseri
21st-century Turkish people